Antonio Francisco Peña Padilla (born June 4, 1957) is a Dominican former professional baseball player, manager and coach. He played as a catcher in Major League Baseball for the Pirates, Cardinals, Red Sox, Indians, White Sox, and Astros. After his playing career, Peña was the manager of the Kansas City Royals between 2002 and 2005. He was most recently the first base coach for the New York Yankees. A four-time Gold Glove Award winner, Peña was known for his defensive abilities as well as his unorthodox squat behind home plate.

Playing career
Peña was signed by the Pittsburgh Pirates as an amateur free agent in 1975. Originally an outfielder, he didn't start playing as a catcher until 1977 while playing in the minor leagues. As a catcher, Peña adopted an unorthodox squat behind the plate when there were no runners on base, extending his left leg straight out while squatting on his right leg. He did this in order to help his pitchers keep their pitches low in the strike zone. In 1979 while playing for the Buffalo Bisons, Peña hit for a .313 batting average along with 34 home runs and 97 runs batted in. The following year with the Portland Beavers, he posted a .323 batting average with a .367 on-base percentage before making his major league debut at the age of 23 with the Pirates on September 1, 1980.

In 1981, Peña platooned alongside Steve Nicosia, hitting for an impressive .300 batting average in 66 games and finished in sixth place in the 1981 National League Rookie of the Year Award. In 1982, he took over as the Pirates full-time catcher and had a .340 batting average on the first of July, helping him earn a spot as a reserve for the National League team in the 1982 All-Star Game. He finished the year with a .296 batting average. While he committed 16 errors, he finished second among National League catchers in assists and third in putouts and caught stealing percentage.

Peña had one of his best seasons in 1983, posting career-highs with a .301 batting average and 15 home runs as the Pirates improved to finish in second place in the National League Eastern Division. He led National League catchers with 976 putouts and finished second to Gary Carter with a .992 fielding percentage, earning him his first Gold Glove Award. Peña also finished 12th in voting for the 1983 National League Most Valuable Player Award.

After the 1983 season, the Pirates went into a period of decline, finishing in last place for three consecutive years between 1984 and 1986. Although his offensive statistics tapered off, Peña continued to be productive defensively during this period, leading National League catchers in assists, putouts and baserunners caught stealing in 1984 and, again leading the league in assists and baserunners caught stealing in 1985, winning two more Gold Glove Awards and two more All-Star selections in the process. When Peña broke the 100 assists barrier in 1985, he joined Johnny Bench, Jim Sundberg and Gary Carter as the only major league catchers to have more than 100 assists in a season since the end of the Second World War. In a 1986 poll of major league managers, Peña was selected as the best throwing catcher in the major leagues.

In November 1986, Peña led a team of major league All-Stars to victory over a team of Japanese All-Stars and, was chosen as the most valuable player of the American team. Before the start of the following season, with Peña nearing the end of his contract, the Pirates made a decision to trade him rather than lose him through free agency. On April 1, 1987, Peña was traded to the St. Louis Cardinals for Andy Van Slyke and Mike LaValliere.

Three games into his Cardinals' career, he suffered a broken left thumb in a game against his former team, the Pirates. He missed more than a month and returned to post a career-low batting average of .214. Nevertheless, the Cardinals won the National League Eastern Division crown with Peña rebounding to post a .381 batting average in the 1987 National League Championship Series as, the Cardinals defeated the San Francisco Giants. In the 1987 World Series against the Minnesota Twins he produced nine hits with 4 runs batted in (RBI) as the Cardinals lost in a seven-game series.

In 1988, Peña recovered with a .263 batting average along with 10 home runs and 51 runs batted in. He also led National League catchers with a .994 fielding percentage and was second in putouts and third in assists. In 1989, he earned his fifth All-Star selection and, once again led the league's catchers with a .997 fielding percentage, committing only two errors in 134 games.

In November 1989, Peña was granted free agency and signed a contract to play for the Boston Red Sox. With the Red Sox in 1990, he led American League catchers in games played, range factor, putouts and finished second in assists and in fielding percentage. His performance earned him the Gold Glove Award, making him only the second catcher after Bob Boone to earn a Gold Glove in both the American and National Leagues. The Red Sox won the American League Eastern Division pennant before eventually losing to the Oakland Athletics in the 1990 American League Championship Series.

In October 1993, Peña again filed for free agency and signed to play for the Cleveland Indians. Although his batting statistics weren't as strong as his earlier career, Peña was still valued for his strong defensive skills as a catcher. He proved invaluable for the Indians in 1994 as a substitute for the injury-prone starting catcher, Sandy Alomar Jr., while posting a .296 batting average with a .341 on-base percentage.

Peña caught the majority of the Indians' games in 1995 and, although his batting average dropped to .195, he hit a walk-off home run with two outs in the bottom of the 13th inning of Game 1 in the 1995 American League Division Series that helped propel the Indians to a three-game sweep of the Boston Red Sox. The Indians made it all the way to the 1995 World Series before losing to the Atlanta Braves in a six-game series. Peña once again filed for free agency at the end of the season, signing a contract with the Chicago White Sox. He played with the White Sox until August 1997 when he was traded to the Houston Astros. At the end of the year, he retired as a player at the age of 40.

In an eighteen-year major league career, Peña played in 1,988 games, accumulating 1,687 hits in 6,489 at bats for a .260 career batting average along with 107 home runs, 708 runs batted in and a .309 on-base percentage. He ended his career with a .991 fielding percentage. He led his league five times in putouts and twice in fielding percentage, assists, range factor and in baserunners caught stealing. A five-time All-Star, he won four Gold Glove Awards during his career. Peña's 1,950 games played as a catcher rank him sixth on the all-time list. His 156 career double plays ranks fifth all-time among major league catchers.

In 2011, Peña was inducted into the Buffalo Baseball Hall of Fame Hall of Fame along with Cleveland Indians broadcaster Jim Rosenhaus. In 2016, he was inducted into the Caribbean Baseball Hall of Fame.

Coaching and managerial career

In 1999, Peña became the manager of the New Orleans Zephyrs and in 2001 he led them to a first-place finish in the East Division of the Pacific Coast League. He also led Águilas Cibaeñas of the Dominican Winter Baseball League to two domestic championships in 1998 and 2000, and also led them to the 2001 Caribbean Series title.

Peña was hired by the Kansas City Royals in 2002 to replace Tony Muser (John Mizerock had served as interim manager). Peña led the 2003 Royals to a seven-game lead in the American League Central Division by mid-season before settling into a third-place finish in with a record of 83–79. It was the Royals' first season with a winning record since the strike-shortened 1994 season. Peña was rewarded with the 2003 American League Manager of the Year Award.

Peña's Royals were less successful in 2004, finishing in last place in the Central Division of the American League with 104 losses. He resigned as manager of the Royals after a loss to the Toronto Blue Jays on May 10, 2005, as the Royals had the worst record in the American League at 8–25. He was replaced by interim manager Bob Schaefer.

On November 3, 2005, Peña was named first base coach of the New York Yankees. On October 21, 2007, the Yankees announced that Peña would interview to replace Joe Torre as manager. However, the Yankees chose to hire former catcher Joe Girardi to manage the team instead. Peña remained as the Yankees first base coach in 2008, before shifting to the role he played as bench coach from 2009 – 2014. He assumed the role of Yankees first base coach once more when they hired Joe Espada as the third base coach for the 2015 season and shifted former Yankees third base coach Rob Thomson to the role of bench coach.

Peña was considered a candidate to replace Terry Francona as the manager of the Red Sox in 2011 before the job went to Bobby Valentine. In 2012, Valentine was fired as Red Sox manager after just one year, and Peña was interviewed to be the Red Sox manager.

In 2013, Peña was named the manager of the Dominican Republic National Baseball Team for the World Baseball Classic. Armed with a roster that included Jose Reyes, Robinson Canó, Nelson Cruz, Edwin Encarnación, Fernando Rodney, and many others, the Dominican team stormed through the WBC with an 8-0 record, culminating in a championship with a 3-0 victory over Puerto Rico. They were the first team in WBC history to go undefeated throughout the tournament.

After the 2017 season, the Yankees hired Aaron Boone to replace Girardi as manager, and Peña was replaced by Reggie Willits.

Personal life
Peña is married to Amaris and they have three children. He is the father of pitcher Tony Peña Jr., and catcher Francisco Peña. Peña's daughter, Jennifer Amaris, won Miss RD USA 2007 and represented the Dominican Community in the USA in Miss Dominican Republic 2008 and came in sixth place. His brother, Ramón Peña, pitched with the Detroit Tigers organization.

Managerial record

See also

 List of Major League Baseball career putouts as a catcher leaders
 List of Major League Baseball players from the Dominican Republic

References

External links

1957 births
Living people
Águilas Cibaeñas players
Boston Red Sox players
Buffalo Bisons (minor league) players
Charleston Patriots players
Chicago White Sox players
Cleveland Indians players
Dominican Republic baseball coaches
Dominican Republic expatriate baseball players in the United States
Dominican Republic national baseball team managers
Gold Glove Award winners
Gulf Coast Braves players
Houston Astros players
Kansas City Royals managers

Louisville Redbirds players
Major League Baseball bench coaches
Major League Baseball catchers
Major League Baseball first base coaches
Major League Baseball players from the Dominican Republic
Manager of the Year Award winners
Minor league baseball managers
National League All-Stars
New York Yankees coaches
People from Monte Cristi Province
Pittsburgh Pirates players
Portland Beavers players
Salem Pirates players
Shreveport Captains players
St. Louis Cardinals players
World Baseball Classic managers